Noblella myrmecoides is a species of frog in the family Strabomantidae. It is found in the upper Amazon Basin of southeastern Colombia (Amazonas Department), eastern Ecuador (Orellana Province), eastern Peru (Loreto, San Martín, Huánuco, Cusco, and Madre de Dios Regions), Bolivia (Departments of Cochabamba and La Paz), and western Brazil (Amazonas). Common name Loreto leaf frog has been coined for this species.

Etymology
The specific name myrmecoides is derived from Greek myrmex and -oides, meaning "ant-like", and refers to the small size of the species.

Description
Noblella myrmecoides is a small species: adult males measure  and females  in snout–vent length (SVL). The head is nearly as wide as the body and wider than it is long, and the snout is short. The tympanum is distinct. The fingers and toes are unwebbed; the fingers bear no discs whereas the tips of the toes bear dilated pads and discs. Dorsal skin is slightly granular. The coloration is variable, between light grayish brown to reddish brown. The venter is dark gray or dark brown.

A female measuring  SVL contained six mature eggs  in diameter. It is presumed that the development is direct, i.e., the eggs hatch directly into froglets, bypassing free-living larval stage.

Habitat and conservation
It is a leaf-litter species. While much suitable habitat remains, it is locally threatened by habitat loss caused by, e.g., clear cutting and smallholder agriculture. It is present in the Manú National Park, Peru.

References

myrmecoides
Amphibians of Bolivia
Amphibians of Brazil
Amphibians of Colombia
Amphibians of Ecuador
Amphibians of Peru
Taxa named by John Douglas Lynch
Amphibians described in 1976
Taxonomy articles created by Polbot